Louisa Ma (born 26 November 1994) is an Australian badminton player who competes in international level events.

Achievements

Oceania Championships 
Women's singles

Women's doubles

References

1994 births
Living people
Australian female badminton players